The third election to the Cardiganshire County Council took place in March 1895. It was preceded by the 1892 election and followed by the 1898 election

Overview of the Result

The Liberals were again returned with a large majority. There were a large number of unopposed returns.

Retiring Aldermen

The following aldermen, all of whom were Liberals, retired at the election.

C.M. Williams
David Jenkins, Maesteg, Glandovey
Levi James 
William Davies
J.T. Morgan
David Lloyd
John Davies
Rev John Owen

Only C.M. Williams in Aberystwyth and David Lloyd in Aberbanc sought election. Levi James (Cardigan), William Davies (New Quay), J.T. Morgan (Talybont) and David Jenkins, Glandovey (elected from outside the Council) all stood down and did not seek re-election. John Davies, Tanycoed and John Owen, Blaenpennal, who had filled aldermanic vacancies since 1889 did likewise. All those who stood down retired from county politics apart from J.T. Morgan who was re-elected as an alderman despite not facing the electorate.

Contested Elections
There were fewer contested elections than on the previous two occasions as the politics of the county seems to settle down after the initial contests. In Aberystwyth it was said that the Town Council elections the previous November had elicited much greater interest.

Those seats that were contested witnessed a swing towards the Conservative candidates, who captured a total of seven seats. These included significant victories at Cardigan and Llandysul. The contest in Bow Street could also be regarded as a Conservative gain.

It was said that a plough belonging to a farmer in Borth was destroyed due to his support for the Conservative candidate.

The New Council

The Liberals once again had a comfortable majority. Morgan Evans of Llanarth was elected chairman for 1895/96.

Elected Members

|}

Council following the election of aldermen and by-elections

|}

|}

Results

Aberaeron

Aberarth
Two Liberals faced each other although the sitting member was described as a Conservative in some quarters.

Aberbanc
Dr David Lloyd, whose aldermanic term had come to an end, was elected unopposed in place of Evan Davies.

Aberporth

Aberystwyth Division 1

Aberystwyth Division 2
The sitting member was returned unopposed after E.V. Wynne, chemist, withdrew.

Aberystwyth Division 3

Aberystwyth Division 4

Borth

Bow Street

Cardigan North

Cardigan South

Cilcennin

Cwmrheidol
Nicholas Bray regained the seat he lost in 1892 after winning the initial election in 1889.

Devil's Bridge

Felinfach
This ward was now commonly described as Felinfach rather than Llanfihangel Ystrad.

Goginan

Lampeter Borough
Harford, elected in a close contest in 1889, did not initially seek re-election in 1892, but was returned unopposed after David Lloyd was made an alderman.

Llanarth

Llanbadarn Fawr

Llanddewi Brefi
David Davies had lost his seat at the previous election in 1892 and narrowly lost the by-election following the successful candidate's election as alderman.

Llandygwydd

Llandysiliogogo

Llandysul North

Llandysul South
The sitting member, Enoch Davies, was returned for the neighbouring Penbryn Ward, leading to the loss of this ward to the Conservatives.

Llanfair Clydogau

The sitting member held on against the most prominent Liberal Unionist in Cardiganshire.

Llanfarian

Llanfihangel y Creuddyn

Llangoedmor

Llangeitho
Robert J. Davies of Cwrt Mawr had died shortly after the 1892 election.

Llangrannog

Llanilar

Llanrhystyd

Llanllwchaiarn

Llansantffraed

Llanwnen

Llanwenog

Lledrod

Nantcwnlle
Having captured the seat in 1892, Jenkin Howells held on by a mere three votes over David Jones of Station Road, Lampeter.

New Quay

Penbryn

Strata Florida

Taliesin
John Jones, elected unopposed in 1892, was returned by a small majority over another Liberal

Talybont

Trefeurig
This was the first time Llewelyn Edwards had won a contested election, having been defeated at Llanbadarn Fawr in 1889 and 1892. On the former occasion he was made an alderman despite his defeat and on the latter elected unopposed for Trefeurig following Peter Jones's elevation to the aldermanic bench.

Tregaron
D.J. Williams had previously represented Tregaron as a Liberal Unionist from a by-election in 1889 until 1892 when he did not stand. He was elected for Llanddewi Brefi at a by-election in 1892

Troedyraur

Ysbyty Ystwyth

Election of Aldermen

The overhaul of the aldermanic bench saw the election of key figures from the liberal ranks. Having avoided the principle of electing from outside the Council four years previously this practice was now adopted once again, leading to criticism, most notably from the Liberal-supporting Cambrian News. It was noted in particular that  three defeated candidates were elected, namely James Stevens at Cardigan, Daniel Jones of Llanon and Davies of Cwrtmawr. J.T. Morgan of Talybont was also re-elected although he had not contested the election.

T. H. R. Hughes, Liberal (elected councillor at Llanwnen)  
C. M. Williams, Liberal (retiring alderman; elected councillor at Aberystywth Ward 4)
Morgan Evans, Liberal (elected councillor at Llanarth) 
James Stephens, Liberal (defeated candidate at Cardigan South)  
John Humphreys Davies, Liberal (defeated candidate at Llangeitho)
Enoch Davies, Liberal (elected councillor at Penbryn ) 
J.T. Morgan, Liberal (retiring alderman, from outside Council - did not seek election)
Daniel Jones, Liberal (defeated candidate at Llansanffraed )

Aldermanic Vacancies 1895-1901
Daniel Jones died a few months after the election. In August 1895, James James of Ffynonhowell, from outside of the Council, was appointed to succeed him.

Therefore, the following appointment was made for the remainder of the six-year term.

James Jones, Liberal (from outside the Council)

By-elections

Aberystwyth Division 4 by-election
The Liberals comfortably retained the seat although the Aberystwyth Observer complained that the Conservatives 'made no special effort' to support their candidate.

Llanarth by-election
Following the appointment of Morgan Evans as alderman, James Evans of Esgerwenfawr was selected as a candidate by the local Liberals, and was returned unopposed.

Llanwnen by-election
The Liberals narrowly held the seat following the election of T.H.R. Hughes as alderman.

Penbryn by-election
Following the appointment of Dr Enoch Davies as alderman, the previous member, Peter R. Beynon won the by-election.

References

1895
1895 Welsh local elections
19th century in Ceredigion